Geef Mij Maar Nasi Goreng (En: "Just Give Me Nasi Goreng") is a song which was composed by Wieteke van Dort in 1977. She was born in 1943 in Surabaya, Japanese-occupied Dutch East Indies, and moved to The Hague, The Netherlands, at the age of 14.

The song was written in Dutch and was sung with a thick Indies accent by Van Dort herself. She preserved her memories and love for various Indonesian dishes into the song, i.e. nasi goreng, sambal, krupuk, lontong, pork sate, terasi, serundeng, milkfish, tahu petis, kue lapis, onde-onde, cassava, bakpau, ketan, and palm sugar.

History
The conflict of Irian in 1957 had made the relationship between Indonesia and The Netherlands heat up. It led the Indonesian government to issue an anti-Dutch sentiment which forced most Dutch Indies families to move to The Netherlands, including the Van Dort family. At first, Van Dort could not stand the cold climate of The Netherlands nor its cuisine. She then wrote a song about it to express her longing for Indonesia.

See also
Hallo Bandoeng

References

External links
Geef Mij Maar Nasi Goreng - Tante Lien.wmv Geef Mij Maar Nasi Goreng by Tante Lien (Wieteke).
Orkes Sinten Remen - Geef Mij Maar Nasi Goreng

Dutch pop songs
Dutch-language songs
1977 songs
Indonesian cuisine
List songs